Brighton Rock (US: Young Scarface). is a 1948 British gangster film noir directed by John Boulting and starring Richard Attenborough as violent gang leader Pinkie Brown (reprising his West End role of three years earlier), Rose Brown (Carol Marsh) as the innocent girl he marries, and Ida Arnold (Hermione Baddeley) as an amateur sleuth investigating a murder he committed.

The film was adapted from the 1938 novel Brighton Rock by Graham Greene, and was produced by Roy Boulting through the Boulting brothers' production company Charter Film Productions.

The title comes from the old-fashioned candy "a stick of rock": Ida in the film says that like Brighton rock she doesn't change—as the name Brighton stays written the whole way through.

Plot
In Brighton in 1935, a gangster named Kite is found dead, shortly after a newspaper published a story exposing local rackets and gang wars. Kite's old gang, now led by the psychopathic teenaged hoodlum Pinkie Brown, learns that the reporter who wrote the story, Fred Hale, will be in town for one day for a promotional stunt (similar to the real-life "Lobby Lud" promotion). Fred will play "Kolley Kibber", leaving cards around town that can be redeemed for a monetary prize, with a larger prize for the first person who publicly identifies Fred as Kolley Kibber.

Pinkie and the gang hold Fred responsible for Kite's death. They confront Fred in a local pub, threaten him, and pursue him through the crowded resort town before Pinkie finally murders Fred on an amusement ride. While Fred is attempting to elude the gang, he meets brassy, outgoing Ida Arnold, a middle-aged entertainer currently appearing in a local show. Ida takes a liking to Fred and notes that he appears to be afraid. The police think that Fred's death is a heart attack or suicide, but Ida suspects foul play and begins her own amateur investigation.

To establish an alibi for himself, Pinkie sends one of his gang members, Spicer, to distribute Fred's "Kolley Kibber" cards throughout the town, making it look like Fred was going about his business normally. Spicer errs by leaving one card under the tablecloth in a restaurant, creating a risk that the waitress would be able to identify Spicer. Pinkie visits the restaurant and discovers that the sweet, naive young waitress Rose found the card and noticed that Spicer, not Fred, had left it. Pinkie warns Rose not to speak about the person who left the card, and as part of gaining her confidence, asks her out on a date. Pinkie is also being pressured by Colleoni, the older and more powerful leader of a rival gang, and owner of the large Cosmopolitan Hotel. He is also pursued by the police, who want him to leave town to avoid further gang warfare. Deciding that Spicer is a liability, Pinkie sends him to the racetrack in hopes that Colleoni's men will kill him there. However, Pinkie is also attacked by Colleoni's men, receiving a long scar on his right cheek, and runs off thinking Spicer is dead. However he is told later that Spicer lived. Pinkie ends up finishing Spicer off himself by pushing him down a stairwell in front of several witnesses.

Rose falls in love with Pinkie, discovering he is also a Catholic, and he decides to marry her so she cannot testify against him. After their wedding, at Rose's request he makes a record of his voice at a fairgrounds booth, on which he says, "What you want me to say is I love you. Well here is the truth. I hate you, you little slut. You make me sick." Rose cherishes the record, wrongly assuming that it contains Pinkie's profession of love, although she does not have a gramophone to play it on and is unaware of its true contents. Ida, who by now suspects Pinkie of killing both Fred and Spicer, poses as Rose's mother to visit her while Pinkie is out and warn her about Pinkie, but Rose is loyal to Pinkie and Ida leaves.

Ida's visit makes Pinkie decide he needs to kill Rose too, and he confides to his last remaining gang member, Dallow, his plan to get Rose to enter a suicide pact with him and kill herself first. Pinkie also tries to destroy the voice recording he made to avoid its becoming evidence after Rose's death, but only succeeds in scratching it. Dallow objects, saying Rose's death is unnecessary because Ida is about to leave Brighton, having been unable to find any convincing evidence against Pinkie. Colleoni has also paid off Pinkie and Dallow to leave town, and they go for a final drink with Rose before departing.

When Ida enters the bar, the paranoid Pinkie decides to carry out his plan for Rose's death, and takes her for a walk on the pier. Pinkie convinces Rose he will soon be hanged and the two of them should commit suicide in order to always stay together. He gives Rose his gun and tries to get her to shoot herself first. Rose is torn between her love for Pinkie and the Catholic prohibition against suicide, and hesitates. Meanwhile, Dallow and Ida, both wishing to protect the innocent Rose, alert police, who rush onto the pier after Pinkie. Upon seeing the police, Rose throws the gun into the water and Pinkie tries to run away, but falls from the pier to his death. A grief-stricken Rose later plays the damaged record of Pinkie's voice, which sticks on Pinkie's words "I love you" without playing the rest. Rose clings to the belief that Pinkie really did love her.

Themes

Like the book and like other Greene film adaptations such as The Third Man, the film deals with Roman Catholic doctrines concerning the nature of sin and the basis of morality; damnation, forgiveness and mercy. Rose, and Pinkie (ostensibly), are Catholics, as was Greene; their beliefs are contrasted with Ida's strong but non-religious moral sensibility.

Cast

 Richard Attenborough as Pinkie Brown
 Hermione Baddeley as Ida Arnold
 Carol Marsh as Rose Brown
 William Hartnell as Dallow
 Harcourt Williams as Prewitt
 Wylie Watson as Spicer
 Nigel Stock as Cubitt
 Alan Wheatley as Fred Hale
 Virginia Winter as Judy
 Reginald Purdell as Frank
 George Carney as Phil Corkery
 Charles Goldner as Colleoni
 Lina Barrie as Molly
 Joan Sterndale-Bennett as Delia
 Harry Ross as Bill Brewer
 Campbell Copelin as Police Inspector
 Marianne Stone as Lazy Waitress
 Norman Watson as Racecourse Evangelist
 Ronald Shiner as the Look-Out (uncredited)
 Constance Smith as singer (uncredited)

Production
Greene and Terence Rattigan wrote the screenplay for the 1948 film adaptation, produced and directed by John and Roy Boulting, with assistant director Gerald Mitchell. The ironic ending of the film, in which Rose's damaged gramophone record of Pinkie's voice sticks and repeats the words "I love you", was changed against Greene's wishes from his original story, in which Rose is about to hear the entire recording and will realise that Pinkie hated her. This is described by Greene as "The greatest horror of all". The filmmakers believed censors were likely to object to the more tragic original ending. Instructed to lose weight for the film, Richard Attenborough trained with Chelsea F.C.

Much of the filming was done on location in Brighton, although some locations were recreated in the studio. The scenes where Fred is pursued through Brighton were shot with hidden cameras, capturing footage of Brighton residents and tourists engaged in their regular activities, unaware that a movie was being made. The climax of the film takes place at the Palace Pier, which differs from the novel, the end of which takes place in the nearby town of Peacehaven.

The Colleoni gang was modelled  after the Sabini racetrack gang of the 1930s, which fought public battles with straight razors in its competition to control crime at racecourses in southern England, including one at Brighton. A former Sabini gang member named Carl Ramon served as technical adviser, including teaching Attenborough how to behave as Pinkie. Ramon also appeared in a non-speaking role as a barman.

Carol Marsh was cast as Rose after responding to a newspaper advertisement for a 16 or 17-year-old girl, "frail, innocent, naive, and tolerably but not excessively pretty." Although the film was her most significant role, in 1997 she said that she "had never seen the film and couldn't bear to."

Release and reception 
First screened to the trade and cinema distributors on 25 November 1947, the film held its World Premiere in Brighton on 8 January 1948, followed by a Gala Premiere at the Leicester Square Warner Cinema London on 9 January 1948.

At the time of its release, Brighton Rock caused a critical uproar in Britain due to its depictions of crime and violence, with the Daily Mirror critic denouncing the razor-slashing scenes as "horrific" and concluding, "This film must not be shown." It was banned in New South Wales. Some reviewers, as well as author Greene, also objected to the final scene as sentimental and contrary to the original book's darker ending.

Nevertheless, Brighton Rock was described in the trade papers as being a "notable box office attraction" in British cinemas in 1948.  It was less successful in the United States (where it was released as Young Scarface) and critics did not consider its violence excessive.

Over time, Brighton Rock has maintained a good reputation, with the Encyclopedia of Film Noir calling it "superb". In the British Film Institute's 1999 survey of the top 100 British films, it ranked at #15. It currently scores 100% on Rotten Tomatoes.

New adaptation

A new adaptation of the novel, written and directed by Rowan Joffé, was released in the United Kingdom on 4 February 2010. Joffé changed the setting from the 1930s to the 1960s, during the mods and rockers era.

Revival
The original film had a run at Film Forum in New York City 19–26 June 2009, and The New York Times previewed the revival, saying "both [Greene's] Catholicism and his movie-friendliness are in full cry in John Boulting's terrific 1947 gangster picture."

See also
BFI Top 100 British films

References

External links
 Brighton Rock at the British Film Institute's Film and TV Database
 
 
 
 
 Review of film at Variety

1948 films
1940s crime thriller films
1948 crime drama films
British crime thriller films
British crime drama films
British black-and-white films
1940s English-language films
Film noir
British gangster films
Films based on British novels
Films based on works by Graham Greene
Films set in Brighton and Hove
Films directed by John Boulting
Films with screenplays by Graham Greene
Films with screenplays by Terence Rattigan
Films set in 1935
1940s British films